Kalutara or Kalutota is a major city in Kalutara District, Western Province, Sri Lanka. It is also the administrative capital of Kalutara District. The city holds a unique position for one of the four major rivers in Sri Lanka, the Kalu Ganga, which joins the sea at the centre of the city. Kaluthara is known for making rope, baskets, and other articles from the fibre of the coconut palm. The area also produces the Mangosteens, a fruit introduced from Malaysia in the 19th century.

Etymology
 
Once an important spice-trading centre, the town's name is derived from the Kalu Ganga ('Black River' in native Sinhala). In the 11th Century, the town was temporarily made a capital on the orders of a South Indian Prince. The region was later planted with coconut trees, whose by-products are used for both internal and external trade. The location also boast fortifications (Kalutara fort) dating back from the times when Portuguese, Dutch and British vied for control of the area.

Administration

Kalutara is governed by an Urban Council with a chairman. The council has 20 (since 2018) members, elected by the local government election.
The local board of Kalutara was established in 1878. Then in 1923, the local board was succeeded by the Urban District Council.

Demographic
Kalutara is Sinhalese majority city. Muslims are second largest group in the city. There are also small numbers of Sri Lankan Tamils and Indian Tamils. Others include Malay and Burger. English is widely understood and can be spoken by the local population.

Ethnicity according to Kalutara urban area (2001) 
Source:statistics.gov.lk

Attractions

 Kalutara or Gangatilaka Vihara was built in the 1960s to the south of the Kalutara Bridge, is Kalutara’s most dominant landmark. The white 3 storeys-high dagoba at Kalutara Vihara is believed to be the only Buddha Stupa in the world which is entirely hollow. It contains a smaller dagoba inside. The interior of the Stupa is decorated with paintings of the Jataka tales about the life of the Buddha.
 Kalutara Bodhiya is one of the most sacred Buddha Buddhist sites in Sri Lanka. It is one of the 32 saplings of Anuradhapura Sri Maha Bodiya. Kalutara Bodiya is located on Colombo-Galle road.
 Richmond Castle, Kalutara is a two storey mansion, built in 1896, at Palatota. Richmond Castle is a 42-acre fruit garden estate, originally built for a wealthy regional governor. The architecture is a mix of British and Indian styles, copied from the plans of an Indian Maharaja’s palace designed by a London architect. The building has intricate carvings.
 Calido beach is a thin strip of preserved land which runs between the Kalu River and the Indian Ocean.
 Asokaramaya Buddhist Temple is a Buddhist temple built in 1873, in Kalutara north.
 Kalutara Clock Tower, constructed by Marcus Silva as a memorial for his father, Paul Silva and his mother.

Education
Kalutara has four national schools, eleven provincial schools, two semi-government schools, and three international schools. It also has a branch of Open University of Sri Lanka. A number of the schools and colleges are listed below:
 Gnanodaya Maha Vidyalaya, Kalutara
 Holy Cross College, Kalutara
 Holy Family Convent, Kalutara
 JMC International College, Kalutara
 Kalutara Vidyalaya, Kalutara
 Kalutara Balika Vidyalaya, Kalutara
 Muslim Central College, Kalutara
 Tissa Central College, Kalutara

Kalutara Public library is located near the High Court and one of the largest libraries of Sri Lanka.

Infrastructure

Rail
Kalutara has two railway stations, Kalutara North and Kalutara South. Kalutara South is closest to the heart of the Kalutara town. Kalutara south railway station is a major railway hub on the Coastal or Southern Rail Line (connecting Colombo through to Matara).

Road
Kalutara is located on the A2 highway connecting Colombo, via Galle through to Wellawaya via Matara. As a result a large number of bus services pass through the town. It is the main point for bus routes in Kalutara district.

See also
Kalutara (disambiguation)
Kalutara Urban Council
Kalutara District
Kalutara prison riots
 Kalutara Park SC, a Sri Lankan football club
 Kalutara Physical Culture Centre, a former first class cricket team
 Kalutara Town Club, a first-class cricket team
 Kalutara Stadium
 Surrey Village Cricket Ground, at Maggona, about 10 kilometres south of Kalutara
 Katukurunda Airport located about 4.5 kilometers south of Kalutara

References

External links

 
Populated places in Kalutara District